Cuéntame (Eng: Tell me) is the sixth and last studio album released by Mexican performer Lucerito. It was released in 1989. Most of the songs included on the album were used in the film Deliciosa Sinvergüenza (1990); the album also includes a cover of The Pet Shop Boys' "It's a Sin" titled "Hojas Secas". Cuéntame is one of the biggest sellers on the singer's career, and was the album that inicitated the transition from teenager, being the last album using the diminutive Lucerito.

Cuéntame was executive produced by Spanish producer Miguel Blasco and produced by José Ramón Florez, with Florez writing most of the tracks included. Five singles were released, included the title track which peaked at number 2 in the Billboard Hot Latin Tracks chart in the United States; "Corazón a la Deriva" (also a top-ten hit in the same chart), "Tanto", "Madre", and "Caso Perdido", were also used to promote the album.

Background
Cuéntame coincided with the 10 year celebration of Lucero's career, and also was the album designed to show her mature stage. Although Melody, the record label, refused to change the diminutive Lucerito to Lucero, for marketing reasons, Cuéntame is the last album that carried the diminutive, closing "infant stage" of her career; Lucero's following release, Con Mi Sentimiento (1990) was the first album to achieve this. The singer recorded the album from January to March 1989, in Madrid, Spain, and Bologna, Italy, places where shed had the opportunity to meet some European countries for the first time. Executive producer Miguel Blasco, was commissioned to create the new image for the singer, including art design, clothing and music. J.R. Florez and Loris Ceroni were responsible for selecting and composing all the music and lyrics of the album along with Gian Pierto Di Felisatti. Blasco's idea was to show Lucero as a much more mature singer and with a stronger image (Lucero appears in the front cover in black leather with studs, heavy earrings and curly hair).

Release
Melody decides to launch the album in the Mexican TV show Siempre en Domingo in June 1989. Cuéntame was Lucero's sixth full-length studio album. The album was first promoted by the track "Madre" in April 1989, but the lead single was the title track, which became a number-one hit in Mexico and peaked at number two in the Billboard Hot Latin Tracks chart in the United States; this single ranked in the list for the "Best 100 Songs of the '80s in Spanish" by TV network VH1. "Corazón a la Deriva" was selected as the third single, and peaked at number 8 in the Billboard Hot Latin Tracks chart. "Tanto" and "Caso Perdido" were also released as the fourth and fifth singles. The track "Me Gusta Tu Dinero" was used to promote the film Deliciosa Sinvergüenza (1990).

Track listing
The album is composed by eleven songs and a bonus track for the Cd format, Cuando Llega el Amor from the telenovela of the same name.

Charts

Sales
Cuéntame surpassed Lucero's previous releases on sales, managing to shi. It manages to ship 400,000 units, being awarded a gold and platinum certification in Mexico. The album was a high seller in Costa Rica, Chile, Colombia, Venezuela, Guatemala, and the United States, countries which Lucero visited to promote it.

References

1989 albums
Lucero (entertainer) albums
Spanish-language albums